Marshallberg is an unincorporated area and census-designated place (CDP) in Carteret County, North Carolina, United States. As of the 2010 census it had a population of 403.  It lies on the mainland, directly across Core Sound from Harkers Island and Cape Lookout beyond that.  Lying at the extreme southeast corner of a peninsula, it is isolated from other Carteret County communities and only a single road connects it to the rest of the state.

Geography
Marshallberg is located east of the center of Carteret County, bounded on the east by Core Sound, on the south by The Straits, on the west by Sleepy Creek, and on the northeast by Great Marsh Creek. The community of Gloucester is to the west across Sleepy Creek.

Demographics

References

External links
 Community Website

Census-designated places in Carteret County, North Carolina
Census-designated places in North Carolina
Populated coastal places in North Carolina